Paul David Harpur (born 28 July 1979) is an Australian twice-Paralympian as an athlete with a vision impairment, a lawyer, and university associate professor.
He is known for his expertise in anti-discrimination laws, human rights, labour laws and work health and safety laws.

Sports discipline 
With totally or almost totally blind vision, as an athlete, Harpur is given as B1 Paralympic classification. He has completed in a number of world sporting events, including:

 goalball at the 2000 Summer Paralympics, in October 2000, in Sydney, New South Wales, Australia, with the Australian team;
 athletics at the 2002 Commonwealth Games, in July 2002, in Manchester, England – 100 m Elite Athletes with a Disability (EAD), coming third in the semi-finals at 12.57 s;
 athletics at the 2004 Summer Paralympics, in September 2004, in Athens, Greece – Sprinting in the men's track in the T11 classification, 200 m and placing seventh in the 400 m; and
 athletics at the 2006 Commonwealth Games in March 2005, in Melbourne, Victoria, Australia – 100 m EAD, T12 classification, placing third in the semi-finals with 12.20 s.  He set an Australian record, at 26 years of age.

Part of his philosophy is 'Impossible is only two letters from possible and you do not need sight to have vision'.

Legal career 
Harpur started his law degree in 1998, graduating in 2003, whilst engaged with sports.

A qualified solicitor, Harpur's university teaching areas include anti-discrimination laws, human rights, labour laws, and work health and safety laws.  He has also given TEDx presentations ('Universities as disability champions of change'), and addressed the International Labour Organization in Geneva.

Harpur's 2019 Fulbright Future Scholarship was 'Universally designed for whom?  Disability, the law and practice of expanding the "normal user"'.  In 2021 he was also awarded an Australian Research Council Future Fellowship, investigating how the higher education sector can better support persons with disabilities.

He is presently an associate professor at the TC Beirne School of Law at the University of Queensland.  Harpur has numerous publications including Discrimination, copyright and equality: Opening the e-book for the print disabled (2017), and Ableism at work, disablement and hierarchies of impairment (2019).

Honours 
Harpur is an ambassador for the Australian Human Rights IncludeAbility Network, and chairs the University of Queensland Disability Inclusion Group.

In 2021, he was awarded 2022 Blind Australian of the Year.

He has also been recognised for his role in creating and serving as Chair of the groundbreaking University of Queensland Disability Inclusion Group, which has been recognised with multiple awards. This includes: The University of Queensland 2019 Excellence Award, The University of Queensland Community, diversity and inclusion Award, Champions for Change award by the National Centre for Student Equity in Higher Education & Equity Practitioners in Higher Education Australasia.

Harpur received a 2019 Citation for Outstanding Contributions to Student Learning, from the Australian Award for University Teaching (AAUT) program, "for outstanding leadership in translating disability strategy into a vision of ability equality and core university business."

Disability 
Harpur lost his sight at the age of fourteen when hit by an electric train at Wynnum, Brisbane.

See also 
 Australia men's national goalball team

References

External links 
 International Paralympic Profile
Times Higher Education Article: Where are the leaders with a disability in Higher Education?
Times Higher Education Article: Intersectional Policy

1979 births
Athletes (track and field) at the 1996 Summer Paralympics
Athletes (track and field) at the 2004 Summer Paralympics
Athletes (track and field) at the 2002 Commonwealth Games
Athletes (track and field) at the 2006 Commonwealth Games
Goalball players at the 2000 Summer Paralympics
Australian blind people
Living people
Paralympic goalball players of Australia
Paralympic athletes of Australia
Paralympic sprinters
Visually impaired sprinters
Australian male sprinters
Athletes from Brisbane
Blind academics